For information on all Lamar University sports, see Lamar Cardinals and Lady Cardinals

The 2017–18 Lamar Cardinals basketball team represented Lamar University during the 2017–18 NCAA Division I men's basketball season. The Cardinals were led by fourth-year head coach Tic Price and played their home games at the Montagne Center in Beaumont, Texas as members of the Southland Conference. They finished the season 19–14, 11–7 in Southland play to finish in a tie for fifth place. They lost in the first round of the Southland tournament to Central Arkansas. They were invited to the CollegeInsider.com Tournament where they lost in the first round to UTSA.

Previous season
The Cardinals finished the 2016–17 season 19–15, 10–8 in Southland play to finish in a tie for fifth place. They defeated Southeastern Louisiana in the first round of the Southland tournament to advance to the quarterfinals where they lost to Stephen F. Austin. They were invited to the CollegeInsider.com Tournament where they lost in the first round to Texas State.

Roster

Schedule and results

|-
!colspan=12 style=| Non-conference regular season

|-
!colspan=12 style=| Southland Conference regular season

|-
!colspan=12 style=| Southland tournament

|-
!colspan=9 style=|CIT

See also
2017–18 Lamar Lady Cardinals basketball team

References

Lamar Cardinals basketball seasons
Lamar
Lamar Cardinals basketball
Lamar Cardinals basketball
Lamar